The Carnatic Bank was a bank founded in the year 1788 in British India. The bank was the seventh oldest bank in India.

The bank was eventually merged with the Bank of Madras in 1843.

History

Founding  

The Carnatic Bank was the very first bank founded in the Madras Presidency and served many cities in South India.

The founders of the bank were Josias Du Pré Porcher and Thomas Redhead. Both were European merchants from Calcutta.

Management 

The bank was staffed by mostly British nationals who were drawn mainly from the East India Company.

The bank had most of its offices and branches in the Madras Presidency.

Final years 

The bank was one of four banks that were merged to form the Bank of Madras in 1843: the Madras Bank, the Carnatic Bank, The British Bank of Madras (1795), and the Asiatic Bank (1804). The Bank of Madras is one of the precursors of the Imperial Bank of India and eventually the State Bank of India.

Legacy 

The bank is notable for being the seventh oldest bank in India. 

The bank is also notable for being one of the precursors of the State Bank of India, through its predecessors the Imperial Bank of India and the Bank of Madras.

See also

Indian banking
List of banks in India

References

External links
 Oldest Banks in India
 History of the Bank

Defunct banks of India
Companies based in Chennai
Banks established in 1788